Wilmot Mansion is a historic home located at Bethany, Wayne County, Pennsylvania.  It was built in 1827, and is a two-story, wood-frame dwelling in the Greek Revival style.  It features a pedimented portico supported by four columns.  It was the boyhood home of Congressman, Senator, and abolition advocate David Wilmot (1814-1868).

It was added to the National Register of Historic Places in 1978.

References

Houses on the National Register of Historic Places in Pennsylvania
Greek Revival houses in Pennsylvania
Houses completed in 1827
Houses in Wayne County, Pennsylvania
National Register of Historic Places in Wayne County, Pennsylvania
1827 establishments in Pennsylvania